The Dead Pop Stars (stylized as THE DEAD P☆P STARS) is a Japanese visual kei rock band formed in 1992 by ex-Kamaitachi drummer Kenzi. Its current line-up consists of original members Aki and Kenzi on vocals and drums respectively, Hideto and Kentarou on guitar, and Ruiji on bass.

Band history
The Dead Pop Stars was started in 1992. At the beginning of their career numerous appearances at various small clubs was marked by persistent displays of violent behavior. This contributed to the formation of a menacing charisma, making them legendary within the independent visual kei scene. In 1997 they made a deal with major label VAP and released the album D.P.S, but the next year they returned to the independent music scene again. In 2000 they released 2 singles and an album, but when they released those three CDs original guitarist Hiromi and original bassist Seigo left the band. When they left guitarist Taiji joined as support guitarist and next year Seigo returned. Taiji and Hideto became official members in 2003, and the band became a five-member band. In 2005 Seigo left the band yet again. Support bassist Ruiji became an official member on September 6, 2007, at the band's 15th anniversary gig. On May 14, 2010, it was announced on the band's official mobile website that Taiji would be leaving the group. He was replaced by Kentarou, who joined on September 6. Despite the frequent, difficult-to-keep-track-of line-up changes The Dead Pop Stars remain a prolific touring act, continuing to be as antisocial as ever.

Members
Kenzi/Crazy Danger Nancy Ken chan – drums, percussion 1992–present (ex-Kamaitachi, Anti Feminism)
 – vocals, acoustic guitar 1992–present (ex-The Honey Beez)
 – guitar 2003–present (ex-Gellonimo)
Ruiji – bass 2007–present (ex-The Piass, Anti Feminism)
 – guitar 2010–present

Former members
Hiromi – guitar 1992–2000 (ex-Rosenfeld)
Seigo – bass 1992–2000, 2001–2005 (ex-Girl Tique)
Taiji Fujimoto – guitar 2003–2010 (ex-Judy and Mary, ex-Dirty Trashroad)

Discography
Studio albums
 The Dead Pop 4 Drugs (November 21, 1992)
 Self Violence (July 24, 1994)
 Protest 2 Speed Story (May 21, 1995)
 D.P.S (June 1, 1997)
 Heart Break Bandits (July 26, 2000)
 Star☆Ride (August 31, 2005)
 Quick & Dead (December 5, 2018)

Compilation albums
 Hybrid☆Best-Dead Side≠Pop Side- (June 29, 2005)
 For You Ballade Selection (August 1, 2007)

Singles
 "The All New Generation" (May 26, 1996, distributed for free at Shibuya On Air East)
 
 "Tic (July 1, 1999)
 "Justice/Reject (Destruction Mix)" (1999)
 "...self/The All New Generation" (1999)
 "...for you- Special Edition 2000-"
 
 "Star★Lover" (April 27, 2002)
 "[Chaos-JP]" (December 1, 2002)
 "Judgement×Suspicion" (September 6, 2006)
 
 "Badmen" (January 21, 2018)

Videos
 
 
 With 92720-00212 (June 28, 2000)
 God Save the Revolution (June 27, 2012)
 The 20th Anniversary Memorial Day (October 21, 2015)

References

Visunavi Profile
CD Journal Album Reviews
Oricon Discography

External links
Official website 

Visual kei musical groups
Japanese hard rock musical groups
Japanese heavy metal musical groups
Japanese punk rock groups
Musical groups established in 1992